Machu Colca, Machuqolqa or Machu Qollqa (from Quechua machu old, old person, qullqa, qulqa deposit, storehouse) is an archaeological site in Peru. It lies in the Cusco Region, Urubamba Province, Huayllabamba District, a few minutes outside of Chinchero.

The archeological site features 14 terraces with partial buildings, while the adjacent parking lot is lined with small handicraft stores and a Zip line park.

See also 
List of archaeological sites in Peru
Chinchero District
Kellococha
 Yanacocha

References 

Archaeological sites in Peru
Archaeological sites in Cusco Region
Ruins in Peru
Inca Empire
Cusco Region